Michael Kyrle le Fleming Hankinson (11 February 1905 –) was a British screenwriter, film editor and director. He wrote and directed the 1936 crime film Ticket of Leave for Paramount British. During the Second World War, he directed several documentary films.

Selected filmography

Editor
 Good Night, Vienna (1932)
 Crime on the Hill (1933)
 Hyde Park Corner (1935)
 Take a Chance (1937)

Director
 Ticket of Leave (1936)
 House Broken (1936)
 The Scarab Murder Case (1936)

Screenwriter
 The Broken Melody (1934)
 Ten Minute Alibi (1935)
 Girls, Please! (1934)
 Dusty Ermine (1936)

References

Bibliography
 Low, Rachael. Filmmaking in 1930s Britain. George Allen & Unwin, 1985.

External links

British film editors
British film directors
British male screenwriters
1905 births
Year of death missing
People educated at Tonbridge School